Anupam Sharma is an Indian film director, actor, film producer, and author. Sharma has been widely acknowledged by Australian and Indian media as a producer who pioneered films links between India and Australia since 1997. Sharma was appointed as an Australia Day Ambassador and named one of the fifty most influential professionals in the Australian film industry (Encore Magazine). He is best known for producing Bollywood films filmed in Australia, including Dil Chahta Hai and Heyy Babyy. He is the director of the Australian feature film unIndian, starring Australian cricketer Brett Lee, released in 2015. In 2014 the film was announced by Australian Prime Minister Tony Abbott. As a director apart from unINDIAN he has also directed Indian Aussies (Terms & Conditions Apply), NSW Tourism Ad Campaign, Intellectual Property Awareness Foundation anti-piracy campaign and award-winning Australian feature documentary The Run.

Personal life 
Anupam Sharma was born in Ajmer, in the Indian state of Rajasthan. He attended high school at St. Joseph Academy in Dehradun, after which he moved to Australia to pursue a bachelor's degree in film. He followed his bachelor's degree with a master's degree in Films & Theatre from the University of New South Wales, where he wrote his thesis on Indian Cinema with Distinction.

He is married with two children.

Career 
Anupam Sharma was involved with a series of film and theatre projects in Sydney until he met Feroz Khan in 1998. In 2000, he founded Films and Casting Temple, an award-winning film production, casting and consulting company based from Fox Studios, Sydney, working on more than 275 films, television and advertising projects between India and Australia in 20 years. With the support of Ausfilm, state agencies and companies such as Atlab (now Deluxe), Cutting Edge and The Post Lounge, he started seminars in India, to inform filmmakers about how to use Australian locations and production services in their films.

The Australia-India Film, Arts, Media, and Entertainment Council was formed in Sydney at the end of 2003, under the umbrella of the Australia-India Business Council. The council is headed by Anupam Sharma and enjoys significant co-operation from AusFilm and several state film agencies. In 2003 Sharma line produced Janasheen. In 2001, Anupam Sharma consulted on the Art Department of Baz Luhrmann, 'Moulin Rouge' starring Nicole Kidman on Indian elements. Sharma was the Australian Line producer for Heyy Babyy, which was shot in Sydney and MTV Roadies featured regional New South Wales, which became the highest rating ever on Indian TV in the youth music genre in 2009. It was produced in Australia by Film and Casting TEMPLE.

In 2004, a delegation composed of key players from the Australian entertainment industry including Producer John Winter (Rabbit Proof Fence, Doing Time for Patsy Cline) who was also heading the delegation, Steve Cooper, M.D of the multi-award-winning Australian post-production company, BEEPS, and Shireen Ardeshir from IDP Education supported by The Australia India Business Council (AIBC) and its film chapter the Australia India Film Arts Media and Entertainment (FAME) Council, along with ausFILM, Australian Film Commission, and various State film bodies initiated by Anupam Sharma owner of Sydney-based production company Films and Casting TEMPLE pty ltd was a major player at FRAMES 2004 - the biggest Asian convention on the entertainment business which was held in Mumbai from the 15 to 17 March.

In 2011, he teamed with film veteran Peter Castaldi and launched An Australian Film Initiative AAFI, to market and promote Australian screen culture in non-traditional markets. Anupam Sharma & Peter Castaldi were Festival Directors for the only Australian annual Film Festival in India, with the support of Hugh Jackman in 2011, Baz Luhrmann retrospective in 2012–2013, and Phillip Noyce retrospective in 2014–2015. In 2011 Anupam was on the list of the 50 most powerful and influential professionals in the Australian film industry.

In 2012, Sharma was selected as the head judge for the Special Broadcasting Service (SBS) TV series Bollywood Star. The four-part series follows the search for an Australian Bollywood star, who would go on to win a part in a Bollywood movie. Sharma was termed the Bollywood Czar of Australia, by broadcaster Geire Kami. He was also called the most high-profile Indian film professional in Australia, by Screen International. Also in 2012, he was appointed Australia Day Ambassador for his work in films between Australia and India, an appointment he has been receiving every year since 2013. In 2013, Sharma was commissioned to direct a film by the Australian National Maritime Museum. Titled Indian Aussies - terms & conditions apply, the short tongue-in-cheek documentary humorously explores various aspects of being an Indian Australian.

Sharma directed a series of television commercials for Destination NSW, which were rolled out throughout 2014. The commercials represent one of the largest investments the state has made in India. In August 2014 Anupam was appointed as the first ambassador of the Parramasala Arts Festival. The directorial debut by Anupam, UNindian starring Tannishtha Chatterjee and Brett Lee released in October 2015 in Australia and August 2016 in India. Anupam then produced and directed a documentary on Pat Farmer's epic run called The Run. Sharma is developing a slate of Indian-Australian film projects. The first is a called Honour and the other is a documentary called Bollywood Downunder - showcased at Cannes 2022. The documentary, which includes stars such as Farhan Akhtar, Anupam Kher, Ritesh Sidhwani, Srishti Behl, Siddharth Roy Kapur, Fardeen Khan, and Ashutosh Gowariker is being edited by Karin Steininger(editor of Oscar, Emmy winning and Bafta nominated 'Remembering Anne frank'. Sharma takes his next steps towards the Australia India Film Council - through which he hopes to further bilateral film links between the two countries.

Films 
Production:
 Dil Chahta Hai (2001)
 Heyy Babyy (2007)
 Love Story 2050 (2008)
 UnIndian (2015)
 Indian Aussies: Terms & Conditions Apply (2013)
 From Sydney with Love (2012)
 Being Lara Bingle (2012)
 Love in Space (2011)
 Orange (2010)
 Just dance 2(video game) (2010)
 Crook (2010)
 We Are Family (2010)
 Sankham (2009)
 Victory (2009)
 In Conversation (TV short) (2004)
 Janasheen (2003)
 Hollywood (2003)
 Kitne Door... Kitne Paas (2002)
 Aap Mujhe Achche Lagne Lage (2002)
 Yes & No (short) (2000)
 Beti No. 1 (2000)
 Deewane (2000)
 Hadh Kar Di Aapne (2000)
 Kadhalar Dinam (1999)
 Pyaar Koi Khel Nahin (1999)
 Prem Aggan (1998)
 The Run (2017)
 Bollywood DownUnder (2022)

Acting:
 UnIndian (2015)
 Heyy Babyy (2007)
 Shukriya: Till Death Do Us Apart (2004)
 Get Rich Quick (2004)

Direction:
 The Run (2017)
 unIndian (2015)
 Indian Aussies: Terms & Conditions Apply (2013)

Writer:
 Indian Aussies: Terms & Conditions Apply (2013)

Author credits 
 Contribution to the India and Australia Book, First published in 2011 by Readworthy Productions(P) Ltd. 
 Wrote the "Guide to Filming in Australia" for Indian-Australian productions.
 Wrote a thesis researching the development and nature of songs and dances in Indian cinema titled "Indian Cinema Singing a Different Tune". Received a distinction for this thesis from the University of New South Wales.

Other work 
 2003: ABC "Bollywood Filmmakers Boost Local Australian Industry"
 2008: ABC news story about Bollywood Australia
 2008: ABC news story about the filming of Love Story 2050 in Adelaide
 2008: Channel 10 news story about Bollywood Australia Film
 2009: Channel 7 news report on filming of Love Story 2050 - interview with Anupam
 2009: ABC news story about tourism appeal of Indian films shooting in Australia
 2018: Audi Ad with Virat Kohli

Awards and honors 
 Appointed as an Australia Day Ambassador every year since 2013
 Appointed head of the Australia India Film Arts Media and Entertainment (FAME) Council (a chapter of Australia India Business Council) 2003.
 In 2008 shortlisted as one of the professional faces to watch and the first Indian Aussie to be on such a list by Sydney Magazine
 Named as one of the top 50 movers and shakers of the Australian film industry by Encore Magazine.
 Appointed as the Head of Films for the Australia India Film Fund
 Appointed as one of the FOMA Ambassadors
 Appointed as a part of the advisory board of NewCastle International Film Festival
 Appointed as a part of a panel of experts by IABCA in 2014 and 2018
 The Run won the Best Documentary award at the Newcastle Film Festival
 Jury member at the Golden Trailer Awards 2019
 To chair the inaugural board of the Australia India Film Council (AIFC)

See also 
 
 Films and Temple casting - Official company website for Anupam Sharma
 An Australian Film Initiative website
 Films and Casting TEMPLE pty ltd

References 

Year of birth missing (living people)
Living people
Indian emigrants to Australia
Australian film directors
Australian male film actors
Australian film producers
Australian documentary film producers